Coromandel International Limited is an Indian corporation founded in the early 1960s by IMC and Chevron Companies of USA and EID Parry, headquartered in Hyderabad, Telangana, India. Originally named Coromandel Fertilisers, the company is in the business of fertilizers, pesticides and specialty nutrients. The company is also in rural retail business in the states of Andhra Pradesh, Karnataka and Maharashtra through its Mana Gromor Centres. Coromandel International is part of Murugappa Group and a subsidiary of EID Parry, which holds 62.82% of the equity in the company. The company has sixteen manufacturing units located in the states of Andhra Pradesh, Tamil Nadu, Maharashtra, Gujarat,  Rajasthan, Madhya Pradesh, Uttar Pradesh and Jammu and Kashmir. Its product line includes Gromor, Godavari, Paramfos, Parry Gold and Parry Super.

As of 2020 their revenues stood at ₹13,176.73 crore (US$1.8 billion) and their total assets were at ₹10,148.77 crore (US$1.4 billion).

About Coromandel 
Coromandel International Limited operates in two major segments: Nutrient and other allied businesses and Crop Protection. These include Fertiliser, Crop Protection, Specialty Nutrients and Organic fertiliser businesses. The Company is 2nd largest manufacturer and marketer of Phosphatic fertiliser in India. The Company's Crop Protection products are marketed in India as well as in international geographies, offering wide range of technical and formulation products. The Specialty Nutrients business of the Company focuses on water-soluble fertiliser and secondary & micro nutrients segments. The Company is leading marketer of Organic fertiliser in India and has recently added bio pesticides to its portfolio. It also operates a network of around 800 rural retail outlets across Andhra Pradesh, Telangana, Karnataka and Maharashtra. Through these Retail outlets, the company offers farming services including crop advisory, soil testing and farm mechanization to around 3 million farmers. The Company has a strong R&D and Regulatory setup, supporting the businesses in process development and new product introduction. The Company has 16 manufacturing facilities, producing wide rangeof Nutrient and Crop Protection products, which are marketed through an extensive network of dealers and its own retail centers.
Coromandel was ranked #16 on Business Today's 2009 list of the Best Companies to work for in India. The company confers Borlaug Award for outstanding Indian scientist in the field of agriculture and environment

Business line 
Coromandel is largely engaged in manufacturing of wide range of phosphatic fertilisers, crop protection products, specialty nutrients like sulphur pastelles, water-soluble fertilisers, micro nutrients and organic fertilisers. Coromandel's business can be broadly divided into four parts:

Fertilizers 
Coromandel markets and manufactures wide range of fertilizers which makes it leader in addressable market and 2nd largest producer of phosphatic fertilizers in India. Great Opportunities lies ahead in Fertilizers.

Speciality Nutrients 
Company have recently added one more variety of farm inputs. Speciality nutrients are basically developed to cater the need of particular crops at different stage of growth. These set of chemicals have different combination of secondary and micro-nutrients which provides the basic requirement of crops and helps them to grow.

Retail 
Company is also present in retail sector. Till 2015 company have more than 750 retails centers in villages of Andhra Pradesh, Telangana and Karnataka. One retail store covers 30-40 nearby villages and caters the needs of 5000 farmers families. Pawan kalyan , alex chukka are key founders

References

Fertilizer companies of India
Murugappa Group
Year of establishment missing
1960s establishments in Andhra Pradesh
Companies established in the 1960s
Companies listed on the National Stock Exchange of India
Companies listed on the Bombay Stock Exchange